Ho Chi Minh City I Women's Football Club is a Vietnam women's football club, based in Ho Chi Minh City, Vietnam. The team will play in the Vietnam women's football championship.

The team is currently playing at Thống Nhất Stadium.

History 
The club has a rich history in Vietnam Women's football.

Honours

Domestic competitions

League
 Vietnam women's football championship
  Winners (10): 2002, 2004, 2005, 2010, 2015, 2016, 2017, 2019, 2020, 2021,

Current squad
:

References

External links
 

Women's football in Vietnam